Xi Kappa Inc. (also known as XK)  is established as the first Asian-interest fraternity in the Southeast United States. Xi Kappa has grown to represent 4 collegiate schools in the U.S. and is still growing. Based at four institutions, Xi Kappa has become an example of how Asian Americans of different ethnicities and backgrounds can unite under the banner of brotherhood and become a positive force in today's society.

Mission 
Xi Kappa is committed to fostering individual growth through ensuring personal well-being, promoting scholarship, developing leadership skills, advocating cultural awareness, and instilling fellowship through unwavering Brotherhood.

History

The Beginning 
The “Xi Kappa” tradition was created out of a desire for a difference within the Southern philosophy of “Dixie.” It began as a dream envisioned by Xi Kappa Founder, Jason Dunn, to pave a way to overcome the segregation within the Asian population as well as the American culture. As this journey began, he joined forces with 8 other Asian students at the University of Georgia in 1997, to start a Greek-based organization to break the mold for the average Asian student in the Southeast. Together, the “Xi Kappa Asian-Interest Fraternity”, was formed. These nine men, Jason Dunn, Christian Deguzman, Howard Hsu, Brian Le, Eliot Kim, Sam Kim, Phong Nguyen, Trung Pham, and Ben Wong set out to make a difference with a bond greater than just brotherhood.

The Next Step
In the beginning of 1998, these nine men set out to create this Asian-interest fraternity with an objective to promote the very Asian heritage that brought them together. Despite the differences of personalities and backgrounds, they bonded together to work for that common objective. These nine men challenged themselves to come together and form a brotherhood for students with the same Asian heritage and interest to bond and share their common cultural backgrounds.

The Xi Kappa Order
With a family base of more than 30 brothers in less than 2 years, the future of Xi Kappa looked bright. Later, several brothers left to pursue their own organization with the intention of promoting the same ideals that all of the other brothers had shared. This moment in Xi Kappa history marked times with turmoil, confusion, anger, and sadness. But despite the time of low morale, the remaining brothers of Xi Kappa banned together to form a greater bond. This moment of the truth revealed the ultimate transformation, which is called “The Xi Kappa Order.” The Xi Kappa Order truly exemplifies the definition of brotherhood: Honor, Truth, Respect, Loyalty, of which even the Founders in the beginning strived for. So with a moment of turmoil, a moment of Reconstruction brought the best out of men. A true understanding of “integrity” is what the Xi Kappa Order strives to instill among all of its Brothers. So, the journey continues to bring the brotherhood to bond together in times of joy and also in times of turbulence. Enter the new beginning of Xi Kappa.

Risk and Management and Policies

Anti-Hazing Policy
Xi Kappa strictly prohibits hazing in any form as a term or condition of membership in the organization. No chapter of Xi Kappa is allowed to partake in any form of hazing of its prospective members.

Hazing describes a practice that puts new members in unnecessary mental and physical harm. Regardless of the many definitions and standards of what is considered “hazing”, the National Board takes any hazing allegations very seriously, and will respond appropriately.

The Fraternal and Information Programming Group (FIPG) defines hazing as:

"Any action taken or situation created, intentionally, whether on or off fraternity premises, to produce mental or physical discomfort, embarrassment, harassment, or ridicule. Such activities may include but are not limited to the following: use of alcohol, paddling in any form, creation of excessive fatigue, physical and psychological shocks, quests, treasure hunts, scavenger hunts, road trips or any other such activities carried on outside or inside of the confines of the chapter house; wearing of public apparel which is conspicuous and not normally in good taste, engaging in public stunts and buffoonery, morally degrading or humiliating games and activities, and any other activities which are not consistent with academic achievement, fraternal law, ritual or policy or the regulations and policies of the educational institution or applicable state law."

Philanthropy

The National Asian-American Pacific Islander Mental Health Association
Xi Kappa has The national Asian-American Pacific Islander Mental Health Association (NAAPIMHA) as our National Philanthropy.  NAAPIMHA is the only national organization designed to specifically address the mental health needs of Asian Americans, Native Hawaiians, and Pacific Islanders (AANHPI).  NAAPIMHA's mission is to promote the mental health and well-being of AANHPI communities.  The organization advocates on behalf of AANHPI mental health issues as well as serves a forum for effective collaboration and networking between stakeholders of community-based organizations, consumers, family members, service providers, program developers, researchers, evaluators, and policy makers representing various ethnic and regional differences.  For more information about the organization and how you can help, please see their website at: https://web.archive.org/web/20121203225030/http://naapimha.org/

Chapters
These are the chapters of Xi Kappa. Active chapters noted in bold, inactive chapters noted in italics.

References 

Fraternities and sororities in the United States
Student organizations established in 1998
1998 establishments in Georgia (U.S. state)